Haimchar is an upazila of Chandpur District in the Division of Chittagong, Bangladesh.

Geography
It has 20,946 households and a total area of 174.49 km2.

Demographics
According to the 1991 Bangladesh census, Haimchar had a population of 113,306. Males constituted 51.29% of the population, and females 48.71%. The population aged 18 or over was 52,033. Haimchar had an average literacy rate of 25.4% (7+ years), compared to the national average of 32.4%.

Administration
Haimchar Upazila is divided into six union parishads: Char Bhairabi, Dakshin Algi Durgapur, Gazipur, Haimchar, Nilkamal, and Uttar Algi Durgapur. The union parishads are subdivided into 27 mauzas and 65 villages.

See also
Upazilas of Bangladesh
Districts of Bangladesh
Divisions of Bangladesh

References

Upazilas of Chandpur District